Obsession is the Third studio album by Filipina singer Rachelle Ann Go. Released in 2007, Obsession. Singles released from the album is Alam Ng ating Mga Puso And Dont Say Goodbye.

Track listing
 "And Me U"
 "Alam Ng Ating Mga Puso"
 "This Must Be Love"
 "Don't Say Goodbye"
 "You Are My Obsession"
 "I'm sure"
 "And You Love Me"
 "Iyong-iyo"
 "Walk Into My Life"
 "Somethings In the Air"
 "My Forever Love"
 "I Will Always Love You Anyway"
 "Come One Day"

References

2007 albums